Bratislava Stock Exchange (Slovak: Burza cenných papierov v Bratislave, abbr. BSSE, BCPB) is a Stock Exchange in Bratislava, that began its existence on 15 March 1991 according to adjudication of Ministry of Finance of Slovakia in 1990. BSSE is the only organizer of the market with the security papers in Slovakia. It is in operation since 21 June 2001.

The trading started at BSSE on 6 April 1993. The seat of the stock exchange is Vysoká 17, Bratislava.

Index 
The official stock index for the Bratislava Stock Exchange is SAX (abbr. from Slovenský akciový index; in Slovak: Slovak Share Index). It is a capital-weighted index based on a comparison of market capitalization selected set of shares with a market capitalization of the same set of the reference date. It is an index that reflects the overall change of assets associated with investing in shares, which are included in the index. It includes changes in prices as well as dividend income and income related to changes in the size of the share capital.

The initial value of the index is 100 points and binds to the date of the 14 September 1993.

Index composition 
 Biotika, a.s.
 OTP Banka Slovensko, a.s.
 Slovenské energetické strojárne, a.s.
 Slovnaft, a.s.
 Všeobecná úverová banka, a.s.

External links 
 BSSE homepage
 IndexSAX

Stock exchanges in Europe
Economy of Slovakia
Organisations based in Bratislava
Slovakian companies established in 1991
Financial services companies established in 1991